The Anthology of Planudes (also called Planudean Anthology, in Latin Anthologia Planudea or sometimes in Greek Ἀνθολογία διαφόρων ἐπιγραμμάτων ("Anthology of various epigrams"), from the first line of the manuscript), is an anthology of Greek epigrams and poems compiled by Maximus Planudes, a Byzantine grammarian and theologian, based on the Anthology of Cephalas. It comprises 2,400 epigrams.

The Anthology of Planudes starts with the text: «Ανθολογία διαφόρων επιγραμμάτων, συντεθειμένων σοφοίς, επί διαφόροις υποθέσεσιν ...» (Anthology of various epigrams, created by wise people, about different subjects ...) and consists of seven books.

It can be found in an autograph copy of Planudes in Biblioteca Marciana (codex Marcianus gr. 481) in Venice but also in two apographs, one in an incomplete edition (in London, British Library Add MS 16409) and the other in the final edition of the anthology (which is only in fragmentary form, in Paris, Paris B.N. gr. 2744), as well as in several printed editions.

Several printed copies of the Planudean Anthology were made, as it was the only known anthology of Greek epigrams and poems until 1606, when the Palatine Anthology manuscript was found.

The anthology is today part of the corpus of texts known today as the Greek Anthology. The 397 epigrams not found in the Palatine Anthology (also mentioned as 395 and often as 388) are usually included in the Greek Anthology as the Appendix Planudea.

Content
Even though the Anthology of Planudes is based in the Anthology of Cephalas, comparison with the Palatine Anthology (also based on Cephalas's anthology) shows that not only many poems and epigrams were omitted (Palatine has 3700 epigrams, while the Planudean only 2400), but also Planudes made several mistakes or "corrections". At the beginning the transcription was done accurately, but after a certain point omissions become more and more as if the author lost his interest or was pressed to finalise the books. As a result, when the much more accurate Palatine Anthology was discovered, the interest of researchers was shifted from the Planudean to the Palatine. The only important element of the Planudean collection are the 388 epigrams not found in the Palatine, which are considered to have been part of the Anthology of Cephalas, but for an unknown reasons were not transcribed in the Palatine Anthology.

Editions and text of Planudean Anthology

The first printed edition of the Anthology of Planudes (editio princeps) was printed by Janus Lascaris in 1494 in Florence under the title «Anthologia Graeca». It was also printed later on by Aldus Manutius (Venice 1503, 1521, 1551), Badius Ascensius (Paris 1531),  P. and J.-M. Nicolini (Venice 1550), Jean Brodeau (Basel 1549), Henricus Stephanus (Paris 1566).

The edition of Bosch was printed between 1795 and 1822 in Utrecht in five volumes with Latin translation by Hugo Grotius entitled «Anthologia Graeca cum versione Latina Hugonis Grotii». Apart from the text of the Planudean Anthology, this edition also had other texts included after the first half of the third book.

Anthologia Graeca cum versione Latina Hugonis Grotii, Volume 1, Claude Saumaise, Ultrajecti e Τypographia B. Wild & J. Altheer, 1795 Volume 1 and beginning of the text of the Planudean Anthology, Books 1-2
Anthologia Graeca cum versione Latina Hugonis Grotii editae Ab Hieronymo de Bosch, Volume 2, Jeronimo de Bosch, Hugo Grotius, Ultrajecti e typographia Wild & Altheer, 1797 Volume 2 and text of the Planudean Anthology - Books 3-4
Anthologia Graeca cum versione Latina Hugonis Grotii editae Ab Hieronymo de Bosch, Volume 3, Ultrajecti  e typographia B. Wild & J. Altheer, 1798 Volume 3 and text of the Planudean Anthology - Books 5-7 and Mantissa Vetus, page 288, Mantissa secunda de Graecis heriobus adjecta ab Henrico Stephano, page 399, until 4th and then texts of Theokritus (Eidyllia) until page 469.
Observationes et notae in Anthologiam Graecam quibus accetum Cl. Salmasii, Notae ineditae, Volume 4, Hieronymi de Bosch, David Jacob van Lennep, Claude Saumaise, Ultrajecti  e typographia B. Wild & J. Altheer, 1810, Volume 4 and contents
Hieronymi de Bosch Observationum et Notarum in Anthologiam Graecam volumen alterum quod indices continet, opus Boschii morte interruptum David Jacobus van Lennep aboluit, Ultrajecti e typographia J. Altheer, 1822, Volume 5

See also
List of anthologies of Greek epigrams

References

External links
 on-line version of the Biblioteca Marciana manuscript BNM Gr. Z. 481 (=863)
 Anthologiae planudeae - Appendix Barberino-Vaticana, Leo Sternbach (ed.), Lipsiae, in aedibus B. G. Teubneri, 1890.
 
 

Byzantine literature
Greek Anthology
Ancient Greek poets